David Martin Frank (born November 13, 1957) is an American music producer, composer, classically trained pianist, and founding member of the 1980s R&B group the System. Yamaha Music calls him "the founding father of electronic R&B."

Early life and education
Frank grew up in the Boston suburb of Weston, Massachusetts and played classical piano at a recital level from a young age.  By fifth grade he had won his first composing competition.  In high school, Frank played in rock bands hired for dances and competed, often successfully, in talent shows and battle of the band contests.  He attributes his fluency with soul and R&B music to an early encounter he had with a singer he met at one such contest.  The singer was later incorporated as a member of his band.  His studies continued throughout his youth as a student at the New England Conservatory and later at the Berklee College of Music. While at New England Conservatory, an instructor brought in a copy of Wendy Carlos' groundbreaking album Switched-On Bach.  Frank had already been experimenting with getting electric guitar sounds out of his Farfisa organ, and was inspired by this encounter to continue pursuing electronic musical directions.

Career
Upon graduating from Berklee, David began playing in bands around the Greater Boston metropolitan area. The bass player in one of such bands exposed him to an ARP Odyssey synthesizer for David to play. The new sounds intrigued him so much that, borrowing the money from his dad, he bought one for himself the next day. Meanwhile, Frank worked as a wedding musician.

The System
In 1981, while he was working in New York City, Frank was called in to do a session for a local studio owner who suggested that he use the time to create a dance song. Frank initially wanted to use his upstairs neighbor and bandmate, a pre-stardom Madonna. Instead he called up another singer, Mic Murphy, whom he knew while working as a tour keyboardist with Kleeer. A marathon recording session resulted in "In Times of Passion."  The next day, the System was signed to Mirage Records which was a subsidiary of Atlantic Records. "In Times of Passion" became both a radio and club hit in New York. The interest sparked enough interest for Mirage to give David and Mic an advance for an album. The album, Sweat, launched club hits "Sweat," "I Won't Let Go" and the iconic "You Are In My System". Robert Palmer's cover of the song became a mainstream rock hit.  As keyboard synthesist and arranger David helped out on  hit recordings that defined the sound of that era with Chaka Khan's "I Feel For You", Phil Collins' "Sussudio," and Mtume's "Juicy Fruit." He worked with Arif Mardin on three songs on Scritti Politti's album Cupid & Psyche 85 and with Russ Titelman on Steve Winwood's album Back in the High Life arranging the live horns on the album as well as the synth horns on the #1 hit "Higher Love". And lastly he was recognized for the System's #1 hit "Don't Disturb This Groove" in which Frank firmly established his prowess as a bass-groove synthesizer innovator and master. Frank and Murphy produced tracks on albums for artists including Ashford and Simpson, Phillip Bailey of Earth Wind and Fire, Jeff Lorber, Angela Bofill and Nona Hendrix.

Move to Los Angeles
In the early 1990s, Frank moved to Los Angeles where he opened his own recording studio called Canyon Reverb. One of the first artists he worked with in LA was RCA recording artist Omar on his albums For Pleasure and This is Not a Love Song. In 2012 Omar was awarded an MBE award for service to music by Queen Elizabeth of England. David became actively involved in the creative scene in Los Angeles. Through his publisher, Frank met songwriter Steve Kipner, and through friends he met New Zealand songwriter Pam Sheyne. Together they went on to generate several hit songs (Dream's "He Loves U Not", "This Is Me", 98 Degrees' "The Hardest Thing", O-Town's "These Are the Days" as well as Christina Aguilera's "Genie in a Bottle"). "Genie" won him an Ivor Novello Award for international hit of the year.

Currently, Frank is signed as a songwriter to Universal Music Publishing Group and works with songwriters in Los Angeles, New York, and London. Recently, he worked on French pop artist Christine and the Queens' album Chris doing keyboards, piano synth bass and synthesizer. He also arranged horns on Michael McDonald's most recent album Wide Open as well as being a writer on "Crying in the Club" by Camila Cabello.

Discography
Frank is a credited contributor as either a producer, songwriter, or musician on the following songs or albums:
98 Degrees - 98° & Rising
Acoustic Moods (Various Artists)
American Juniors - American Juniors
Angela Bofill - Let Me Be the One
Attitude - Pump the Nation
Ashford and Simpson - Love or Physical
Bardo Pond - Amanita
Beverly Hills Cop film soundtrack
Best of Acid Jazz [Global]
Billy Idol - Whiplash Smile
Billy Squier - Enough Is Enough
Brie Larson - Finally Out of P.E.
Carole Davis - I'm No Angel
Chaka Khan - ck
Chaka Khan - I Feel for You
Christina Aguilera - Christina Aguilera
Coming to America film soundtrack
Divas of Dance Vol. 1
Destiny's Child - Destiny's Child
Dupont - New World Beat
Dream - It Was All a Dream
Eden's Crush - Popstars
Eric Clapton - Rush
Eternal - Power of a Woman
Everybody Dance: 3 CD Limited Edition
Dionne Farris  - Wild Seed – Wild Flower
Gang Related soundtrack
Katey Sagal - Well...
James Morrison - Undiscovered
Junior - Best of Junior
Jeff Lorber - Step by Step
Jeff Lorber - West Side Stories
Jordin Sparks - Jordin Sparks
Kleeer - The Very Best of Kleeer
Laura Nyro - Walk the Dog and Light the Light
Liberty X - Being Somebody
Linear - Caught in the Middle
"Lost Souls" - by 2Pac featuring Outlawz samples "Don't Disturb This Groove"
Love Shouldn't Hurt (Various Artists)
Marked for Death film soundtrack
Masters at Work - The Album
Michael McDonald - Blink of an Eye
Mtume - Juicy Fruit
Mtume - You, Me and He
Nikki Cleary - Nikki Cleary
Nine
Nona Hendryx - Female Trouble
Ofra Haza - "Ya Ba Ye" (Remix)
Omar - For Pleasure
Omar - This Is Not a Love Song
O-Town - O-Town
Pauli Carman - Dial My Number
Paul Lekakis - Tattoo It
Phoebe Snow - Something Real
Phil Collins - No Jacket Required
The Pussycat Dolls - Doll Domination
Rebbie Jackson - Yours Faithfully
Robert Palmer - Pride
Rod Stewart - Human
Ronan Keating - Turn It On
S Club 7 - Don't Stop Movin'
Scritti Politti - Cupid & Psyche 85
Sheena Easton - "My Cherie" (single)
Sheena Easton - What Comes Naturally
Steve Winwood - Back in the High Life
Steve Winwood - The Finer Things
The System - Don't Disturb This Groove
The System - Sweat
The System - X-Periment
The System - The Pleasure Seekers
The System - Rhythm & Romance
Takeshi Itoh - T.K.
Toya - Toya
Vanessa Williams - The Comfort Zone
Vitamin C - More
Westlife - Westlife
Wild Orchid - Wild Orchid
Wayne Watson - Field of Souls
YM Hot Tracks Vol. 1

See also

References

External links

David Frank 2012 Audio Interview at Soulinterviews.com
AllMusic entry

1952 births
Living people
People from Weston, Massachusetts
Musicians from Boston
The System (band)
Record producers from Massachusetts